Tulip Rizwana Siddiq   (born 16 September 1982) is a British politician serving as the Member of Parliament (MP) for Hampstead and Kilburn since 2015. A member of the Labour Party, she was the Camden London Borough Councillor for Regent's Park from 2010 until 2014.

Early life

Siddiq is the daughter of former Dhaka University professor Shafique Ahmed Siddique, and Sheikh Rehana, who gained political asylum in the UK as a teenager. The two met when Shafiq Siddiq was studying for a PhD, and married in Kilburn in 1980. Tulip Siddiq was born in St Helier Hospital in St Helier, London, and has an elder brother, Radwan "Bobby" Mujib, and a younger sister, Azmina Siddiq.  When she was 15, the family moved to Hampstead. She was raised a Muslim and has said that her "family embraced multicultural Britain". In the heart of North London's Jewish community, she attended seder with neighbours and went to Limmud. As a child, she met Nelson Mandela, Bill Clinton and Mother Teresa, and her family was invited to the White House.

She attended The Royal School, Hampstead, and Mill Hill School before completing her undergraduate degree in English Literature at University College London and then a master's degree at King's College London. In September 2011, she completed a second master's degree in Politics, Policy and Government.

Her maternal grandfather is Sheikh Mujibur Rahman, founding father and the first President of Bangladesh. Her mother's elder sister, Sheikh Hasina, has been the Prime Minister of Bangladesh since 2009. 
In 1975, a faction of Bangladesh Army soldiers stormed Siddiq's mother's home in Bangladesh and assassinated Siddiq's grandfather, Sheikh Mujibur Rahman, alongside his three sons and 16 other members of his family in a military coup. Siddiq's mother and aunt survived as they were visiting Germany.

Early political career
At the age of 16, Siddiq joined the Labour Party. Siddiq's father suffered a stroke, which left him disabled and unable to speak for five years. She has cited the NHS and the care her disabled father received as the reason why she joined. She identified Barbara Castle as her political heroine and has described her mother and maternal aunt as "two very strong feminists".

She has worked for Amnesty International, the Greater London Authority, at Philip Gould Associates, the political consultancy firm run by New Labour strategist Philip Gould, Save the Children, and Brunswick, where she worked on corporate social responsibility initiatives for major British manufacturers, as well as for MPs Oona King, Sadiq Khan and Harry Cohen. Siddiq worked on Ed Miliband's campaign to be leader of the Labour Party, and as a special advisor to Tessa Jowell. She has campaigned for political parties internationally and, in 2008, campaigned for Barack Obama in the U.S.

In a 2006 by-election, Siddiq stood unsuccessfully for Camden Council. In the 2010 local government elections, Siddiq became the first female Bangladeshi councillor for Camden Council, where she was Cabinet Member for Culture and Communities until May 2014.

In July 2013, Siddiq was selected by local party members as the Labour prospective parliamentary candidate for the Hampstead and Kilburn constituency, despite a smear campaign. Siddiq later claimed that because of her Muslim surname, she was advised against standing in the constituency by senior party members due to Hampstead's large Jewish population. During 2013 and 2014, she campaigned against the proposed high-speed railway expansion High Speed 2, and high payday lender charges on Kilburn High Road. She also campaigned in support of local services, such as to keep Belsize Fire Station open, to improve disabled access at West Hampstead tube station and to save the Swiss Cottage post office.

Parliamentary career
In the 2015 general election, Siddiq won the Hampstead and Kilburn seat with 23,977 votes, with a turnout of 67.3%. The seat was previously held by Glenda Jackson. The seat had previously been the second most marginal in the country after Jackson retained the seat by just 42 votes in 2010 and was billed in 2015 as the UK's most marginal general election contest. In June 2015, Siddiq was appointed a vice-chair of the All-Party Parliamentary Group against Antisemitism. She is also a member of the Women and Equalities Select Committee. In the same month, she was one of 36 Labour MPs to nominate Jeremy Corbyn as a candidate in the Labour leadership election, although she later supported Andy Burnham.

In September 2015, Siddiq along with Keir Starmer and Catherine West wrote a letter to British Prime Minister David Cameron seeking urgent action to address the refugee crisis due to the Syrian Civil War. In the same month, she was appointed Permanent Private Secretary to the Shadow Minister for Culture, Media and Sport, Michael Dugher. In November 2015, she campaigned against changes to junior doctor contracts. In the same month, Siddiq's maiden speech in Parliament was judged one of the top seven from 2015's intake of MPs by the BBC. In October 2016, she was appointed as Shadow Education Minister in the Labour Party's frontbench in Parliament, taking on the childcare and early years education brief and working with Shadow Secretary of State for Education Angela Rayner.

In November 2016, Siddiq supported a motion in Parliament for the UK to withdraw support for the Saudi Arabian-led intervention in Yemen. In January 2017, she resigned from the Labour frontbench over Labour's three-line whip, to vote against triggering Article 50 of the Treaty on European Union. Siddiq stated that because around 75% of her Hampstead and Kilburn constituency voted to remain in the European Union as one of the top 10 remain areas, she could not "reconcile" herself with Labour's position. Siddiq won an endorsement from Camden for Europe, Open Britain and Best for Britain, due to her decision to vote against Article 50. She retained her seat with an increased majority of 15,560.

In August 2017, Siddiq called for businesses to "address imbalance" in the employment of BAME individuals to improve the diversity of its workforce. In September 2017, Siddiq was appointed as Chair of the new Childcare and Early Education All-Party Parliamentary Group (APPG). In the same month, Siddiq wrote to the Home Office to ask for children's passports to be amended to contain both their parents' names to avoid confusion at airports and borders. Siddiq had been stopped with her daughter at UK border control whilst returning from a family holiday until her husband joined them, because she did not have the same surname in her passport as her child.

In November 2017, whilst campaigning for the release of her constituent, the British-Iranian citizen Nazanin Zaghari-Ratcliffe, who was detained in Iran, she was asked by Alex Thomson of Channel 4 News and ITN about using her family ties to the Bangladeshi government, led by her aunt, in order to liberate British Bangladeshi barrister Ahmad bin Quasem, who is thought to have been abducted by state security forces in Bangladesh. The programme's editor, Ben de Pear, complained about Siddiq's "threatening behaviour" to a pregnant producer, while Siddiq complained to the police about her interlocutors. She later apologised in a statement to the producer, Daisy Ayliffe, for the offence caused.

In May 2018, Siddiq supported an equal pay campaign aimed at building pressure on employers. In the same month, Siddiq described the actions of the Israeli military during demonstrations on the Gaza border as "unjustified" and "inhumane". She said: "I condemn without reservation these violations of international law and human rights by Israel... The protest has been twofold – to highlight the shocking conditions which Palestinians are forced to live in and to demand their right to return to their homes..." In August 2018, Tulip Siddiq joined international calls for her aunt's government to release Bangladeshi photographer Shahidul Alam, who had been jailed after reporting about protests by schoolchildren over road safety problems, and had subsequently stated he was tortured.

Other activities

Siddiq was a board member of West Euston Partnership and is governor of the Camden and Islington NHS Foundation Trust. She served as national BAME (Black, Asian and Minority Ethnic) Officer for Young Labour and Women's Officer for London Young Labour. She is an executive board member of Unite the Union, a member of the Co-operative Party, a fellow of the Royal Society of Arts and is also a member of the Commonwealth Journalists Association (UK). She also oversaw Camden's engagement with the 2012 London Olympics, which saw the launch of three legacy schemes to encourage more physical activities, Camden Sports Academy, School and Community Games, and Pro-Active Ambassadors.

Siddiq served two years as a school governor at Beckford Primary School and Richard Cobden Primary School and is a current governor at the Working Men's College in Camden. As of January 2014, Siddiq supports a number of organisations in Hampstead and Kilburn, including school governor roles at Emmanuel Primary School and Granville Plus Nursery as well as being a trustee of the Camden Arts Centre. She has also written for Hampstead and Highgate Express as a foreign correspondent, primarily covering the U.S. elections.

Recognition
In January 2013, Siddiq was named in the "British Bangladeshi Power & Inspiration 100". In December 2014, she was named by The Guardian as "one to watch" in British politics. In April 2015, The Sunday Times described her as one of the "rising stars" of the Labour Party.

Personal life
Siddiq is a Muslim, but said she is "more cultural than religious". In 2013, Siddiq married Christian Percy. Siddiq lives in West Hampstead, London with her husband.

In April 2016, Siddiq gave birth to a daughter at the Royal Free Hospital in Hampstead. She gave birth to a son in January 2019. Two days before the birth she attended the Commons in a wheelchair, for a critical Brexit-related vote. On 29 January, following a constitutional change, she became the first ever MP to vote by proxy.

Since becoming an MP, Siddiq has spoken at Limmud and attends synagogue events. In April 2019, Siddiq announced that a relative died in the 2019 Sri Lanka Easter bombings.

See also
British Bangladeshi
List of British Bangladeshis
List of ethnic minority politicians in the United Kingdom

References

External links 

Tulip Siddiq on Huffington Post
Tulip Siddiq on Camden Council

Further reading 

 
 
 

 
 
 

1982 births
Living people
English Muslims
English people of Bangladeshi descent
Labour Party (UK) councillors
Councillors in the London Borough of Camden
Labour Party (UK) MPs for English constituencies
Female members of the Parliament of the United Kingdom for English constituencies
British politicians of Bangladeshi descent
21st-century British women politicians
English socialists
School governors
People from Mitcham
People educated at The Royal School, Hampstead
People educated at Mill Hill School
Alumni of University College London
Alumni of King's College London
UK MPs 2015–2017
UK MPs 2017–2019
UK MPs 2019–present
Sheikh Mujibur Rahman family
Scholastica (school) alumni
21st-century Bangladeshi women politicians
Women councillors in England